Heilum Luki (born 11 April 2001) is an Australian professional rugby league footballer who plays as a  forward for the North Queensland Cowboys in the NRL.

Background 
Born in Cairns, Queensland, Luki is of Niuean and Samoan descent and played his junior rugby league for the Cairns Brothers.

He attended Cairns State High School before being signed by the North Queensland Cowboys.

Playing career

Early career
In 2017, Luki represented the Niue under-16 team at the Pasifika Youth Cup in New Zealand.

In 2018 and 2019, Luki played for the Northern Pride in the Mal Meninga Cup. In 2019, he moved up to the Pride's Hastings Deering Colts under-20 side. In June 2019, he played for the North Queensland under-18 side in an exhibition game against the Gold Coast under-18s, being named man of the match in North Queensland's 14–6 win.

On 7 October 2020, Luki signed a development contract with the North Queensland club, joining their NRL squad.

2021
Luki began the 2021 NRL season playing for the Pride in the Queensland Cup.
In round 11 of the 2021 NRL season, Luki made his NRL debut against Newcastle, scoring a try in North Queensland's 36–20 win.

2022
Luki played 14 matches for North Queensland in the 2022 NRL season as the club finished third on the table and qualified for the finals.  Luki did not feature in the finals series which saw North Queensland lose to Parramatta in the preliminary final.

References

External links 

North Queensland Cowboys profile

2001 births
Living people
Australian rugby league players
Australian sportspeople of Samoan descent
Australian people of Niuean descent
North Queensland Cowboys players
Northern Pride RLFC players
Rugby league second-rows
Rugby league players from Cairns